Gruszów may refer to the following places in Poland:

Gruszów, Lower Silesian Voivodeship (south-west Poland)
Gruszów, Myślenice County in Lesser Poland Voivodeship (south Poland)
Gruszów, Gmina Nowe Brzesko in Lesser Poland Voivodeship (south Poland)
Gruszów, Gmina Pałecznica in Lesser Poland Voivodeship (south Poland)
 Hrušov (Ostrava) (Polish: Gruszów), part of the city of Ostrava